Virovitica is a Croatian city near the Hungarian border. It is situated near the Drava river and belongs to the historic region of Slavonia. Virovitica has a population of 14,688, with 21,291 people in the municipality (census 2011). It is also the capital of Virovitica-Podravina County.

Name
Virovitica has also historically been known by the names Wirowititz/Virovititz and Wirowitiza (German), Viroviticza, Verewitiza, Verowitiza, Verowtiza, Verőce (Hungarian) and Varaviza (Italian), Viroviticza or Verucia (Latin).

History
The town is first mentioned in 1234. It was part of Ottoman Empire between 1552 and 1684 and was kaza centre initially in Sanjak of Pojega (1552–1601), later in Sanjak of Rahoviçe in Kanije Eyalet (1601–1684) until the Habsburg conquest in 1684.

In the late 19th century and early 20th century, Virovitica was a district capital in the Virovitica County of the Kingdom of Croatia-Slavonia.

Demographics
The following settlements comprise the administrative area of the city of Virovitica:
 Čemernica, population 653
 Golo Brdo, population 364
 Jasenaš, population 77
 Korija, population 767
 Milanovac, population 1,711
 Podgorje, population 833
 Rezovac, population 1,303
 Rezovačke Krčevine, population 331
 Sveti Đurađ, population 564
 Virovitica, population 14,688

Culture
The patron saint of Virovitica is St. Rocco, celebrated every August 16.

Đorđe Balašević wrote a song titled Virovitica, praising his time spent in the city.

Transportation 
The town lies on the intersection of the state roads D2 and D5 and also has a bus station. 

The towns has one train station and one halt - it lies on R202 railway corridor.

Notable people
 Željka Antunović (born 1955), politician
 Ivan Dečak (born 1979), singer
 Stanija Dobrojević (born 1985) Serbian television personality
 Damir Doma, fashion designer
 Miroslav Feldman (1899–1976), poet and writer
 Andrija Hebrang (1899–1949?), politician
 Tomislav Maretić (1854–1938), linguist
 Ksenija Marinković (born 1966), actress
 Zrinko Ogresta (born 1958), film director
 Renata Pokupić (born 1972), opera singer
 Petar Preradović (1818–1872), poet and general
 Vlado Singer (1908–1943), politician
 Tvrtko Obrdalj (1931), politician

Twin towns – sister cities

Virovitica is twinned with:
 Barcs, Hungary
 Jajce, Bosnia and Herzegovina
 Traunreut, Germany
 Vyškov, Czech Republic

Gallery

References

External links

Virovitica City
Photo Tour of Virovitica

 
Cities and towns in Croatia
Slavonia
Virovitica County
Populated places in Virovitica-Podravina County
1234 establishments in Europe
Populated places established in the 13th century